The 1952–53 Panhellenic Championship was the 17th season of the highest football league of Greece. It was the last season in which the title of champion was to be claimed by the winning clubs from the three main football associations representing the major urban centers (Athens, Piraeus and Thessaloniki). It was also the last in which the final phase was held with the presence of only three teams, the champions of the above associations.

The championship was won by Panathinaikos, in a mediocre final as it developed into a final phase, where in 6 games a total of only 8 goals were scored by the three teams, all from different players, with the result that there was no top scorer for the event. The point system was: Win: 3 points - Draw: 2 points - Loss: 1 point.

Qualification round

Athens Football Clubs Association

The games of the last matchday were not held, because the enlisted football players were not allowed to play with their clubs due to the obligations of the Greek military team in the SISM World Football Cup. The ranking after the completion of the penultimate matchday was considered final.

Piraeus Football Clubs Association

Macedonia Football Clubs Association

Final round

League table

Top scorers

External links
Rsssf, 1952-53 championship

Panhellenic Championship seasons
1952–53 in Greek football
Greek